Kingdom is an anime adaptation of a manga series of the same title written and illustrated by Yasuhisa Hara. A second season was announced on January 23, 2013, and aired from June 8, 2013 to March 1, 2014. The season featured returning staff Minako Seki and Naruhisa Arakawa, the first season's composer and writer, respectively. Akira Iwanaga replaced Jun Kamiya as director, Izumi Nakazawa served as series producer, and the character designs were handled by Itsuko Takeda, Kumiko Tokunaga, and Makoto Shimojima. On December 16, 2020, Funimation announced that the second season of the series would receive an English dub.

The opening theme is "GLORY DAYS" by D☆DATE while the ending themes are "21" by The Sketchbook, "EXIT" by The Sketchbook, and "Soko ni Kimi ga Aru" by The Sketchbook


Episode list

References

2013 Japanese television seasons
2014 Japanese television seasons
Kingdom episode lists